Sir Henry Vernon Drake-Brockman (8 November 1865 – 11 July 1933) was an Indian civil servant who served as a judge in the Central Provinces. He was knighted in 1913.

Born in Madras, Drake-Brockman was the oldest son of Crown Solicitor of Madras Henry Julius Drake-Brockman and Mary Ellinor Christian née Sims. He was educated at Charterhouse and St. Peter's College, Cambridge receiving a BA and LLB in 1886. He passed the Indian civil services examination in 1883 and went to India in 1886 working in the Central Provinces. He was called to the Bar at Lincoln's Inn in 1904 and became a Divisional and Sessions Judge in 1896, additional Judicial Commissioner in 1904 and a Judicial Commissioner from 1906.

References

External links 
 Genealogy

1865 births
1933 deaths
Indian Civil Service (British India) officers
Knights Bachelor
Members of Lincoln's Inn
People educated at Charterhouse School
Alumni of Peterhouse, Cambridge
British India judges